The Pikeville College Academy Building, on College St. in Pikeville, Kentucky, was built in 1890.  It was listed on the National Register of Historic Places in 1973.

It is the oldest building on the campus of what is now the University of Pikeville, and is in fact the oldest educational building in Pike County.  It is a two-story brick building on a stone foundation; its bricks were made on site.

It has also been known as the Pikeville Collegiate Institute Building.

References

University of Pikeville
National Register of Historic Places in Pike County, Kentucky
University and college buildings completed in 1890
1890 establishments in Kentucky